Leyser Levin (1830 – 26 January 1908) was a Prussian-born Australian politician.

Little is known of his early life. He married his wife Johanna in England and had seven children. By the time he entered politics he was a storekeeper in Corowa. In 1880 he was elected to the New South Wales Legislative Assembly for Hume. Re-elected in 1882, he did not re-contest in 1885. Levin died at St Kilda in Melbourne in 1908.

References

 

1830 births
1908 deaths
Members of the New South Wales Legislative Assembly
19th-century Australian politicians